Dunărea may refer to:
 Dunărea, the Romanian name for the river Danube in Central Europe
 Dunărea (river), a tributary of the Danube in Constanța County, Romania
 Dunărea, a village in the commune Seimeni, Constanța County, Romania

See also
FC Dunărea Călărași, a football team
FCM Dunărea Galați, a football team
Stadionul Dunărea, a football stadium, the home of FCM Dunărea Galaţi
FC Dunărea Giurgiu or FC Astra Giurgiu, a football team
Dunăreni (disambiguation)